Burgas Free University is a higher educational institution established with an act of the Great National Assembly on 18 September 1991. It is one of the first non-state universities in Bulgaria, established in the biggest industrial and cultural centre in the south-eastern region of the country, Burgas.

See also
Balkan Universities Network
List of universities in Bulgaria

References

Educational institutions established in 1991
1991 establishments in Bulgaria
Universities in Bulgaria
Burgas
Buildings and structures in Burgas